Keva is the Finnish pension agency responsible for pensions of public sector workers in state, municipal, and state church positions. Keva is responsible for the pensions of 1.3 million workers, and has €35.8 billion in investments. The corporation is defined separately in the Municipal Pensions Act 13.6.2003/549.

The name Keva derives from Kuntien eläkevakuutus, "Pension Insurance of the Municipalities".

Keva covers a total of 1.2 million public sector employees and retirees. In 2017, revenue from contributions to the Keva pension scheme was around €4.8 billion and the market value of investments was around €51.9 billion.

References 

Pension funds
Financial services companies of Finland